is a Japanese UCI Continental cycling team managed by Takumi Beppu and sponsored by .

It was previously formed in 1976 as the bicycle club for the employees of Aisan Industry. The club started racing in earnest in 1987 after registering in the Japan Industrial Track & Field Association.

Team roster

Major wins

2006
Overall Tour de Hokkaido, Taiji Nishitani
Prologue, Kazuhiro Mori
Stage 3, Taiji Nishitani
Stage 4 Herald Sun Tour, Satoshi Hirose
2007
Stage 7 Tour de Taiwan, Satoshi Hirose
Stage 2 Tour de Hokkaido, Taiji Nishitani
Stages 7 & 8 Tour of South China Sea, Taiji Nishitani
2008
Stage 3 Tour de East Java, Taiji Nishitani
Stage 1 Tour de Kumano, Satoshi Hirose
Stages 2 & 3 Tour de Hokkaido, Kazuhiro Mori
Stage 6 Tour de Hokkaido, Taiji Nishitani
2009
 Road Race Championships, Taiji Nishitani
 Time Trial Championships, Kazuhiro Mori
Stage 6 Jelajah Malaysia, Taiji Nishitani
Stage 3b Tour de Singkarak, Taiji Nishitani
Stage 2 Tour de Hokkaido, Kazuhiro Mori
2010
Stage 4 Tour de Langkawi, Taiji Nishitani
Prologue Tour de Hokkaido, Taiji Nishitani
Overall Tour of South China Sea, Kazuhiro Mori
2011
Stage 4 Tour de Langkawi, Takeaki Ayabe
Stage 8 Tour de Taiwan, Taiji Nishitani
Stage 1 Tour de Kumano, Shinpei Fukuda
Stage 3 Tour de Kumano, Taiji Nishitani
Stage 4 Tour de Singkarak, Yasuharu Nakajima
Stage 2 Tour of Hainan, Yasuharu Nakajima
Overall Tour de Okinawa, Kazuhiro Mori
2012
Stage 5 Tour of Japan, Taiji Nishitani
Stage 1 Tour de Singkarak, Masakazu Ito
Stage 6 Tour de Singkarak, Yasuharu Nakajima
Stage 4 Tour of China I, Taiji Nishitani
2013
Stages 1 (ITT) & 6 Tour of Japan, Taiji Nishitani
Stage 3 Tour de Ijen, Shinpei Fukuda
2014
Overall Tour of Thailand, Yasuharu Nakajima
Stage 6, Taiji Nishitani
Stage 1 Tour de East Java, Yasuharu Nakajima
2015
Asian rider classification Tour de Langkawi, Tomohiro Hayakawa
Overall Tour of Thailand, Yasuharu Nakajima
2017
Points classification Tour de Hokkaido, Hayato Okamoto
Stage 2, Hayato Okamoto
2018
Stage 1 Tour de Taiwan, Hayato Okamoto
Stage 3 Tour de Lombok, Shiki Kuroeda
Young rider classification Tour de Kumano, Sora Nomoto
2019
Stage 3 Tour de Ijen, Kakeru Omae
2022
Stage 1 Tour de Taiwan, Hayato Okamoto

References

External links
 (in Japanese)
Aisan Racing Team's Team List in Cycling Fever

UCI Continental Teams (Asia)
Cycling teams based in Japan
Cycling teams established in 2011